Shoval Sofer (born June 30, 1998) is an Israeli female acrobatic gymnast. With partners Avia Brener and May Miller, Sofer competed at the 2014 Acrobatic Gymnastics World Championships, at the 2015 European Games, and at the 2016 Acrobatic Gymnastics World Championships.

References

1998 births
Living people
Israeli acrobatic gymnasts
Female acrobatic gymnasts